The 2013–14 Eintracht Braunschweig season marks the club's first season in the Bundesliga in 28 years.

Review and events
The draw for the first round of the 2013–14 DFB-Pokal happened on 15 June and paired Braunschweig with 2. Bundesliga team Arminia Bielefeld.

The team finished the 2013–14 Bundesliga season in 18th place and was therefore relegated again after one season in the top-flight. Eintracht Braunschweig had spent most of the season on a relegation spot, but had a chance to stay in the league until the very last matchday. They were officially relegated on 10 May 2014 after a 1–3 loss at 1899 Hoffenheim.

Matches and results

Legend

Friendly matches

Bundesliga

League fixtures and results

League table

DFB-Pokal

Squad

Current squad

Transfers

In

Out

Management and coaching staff 
Since 12 May 2008, Torsten Lieberknecht is the manager of Eintracht Braunschweig.

Before the season, former Eintracht Braunschweig player Patrick Bick joined the staff as the club's chief physiotherapist.

Reserve team 

Eintracht Braunschweig II plays in the fourth-tier Regionalliga Nord for the 2013–14 season.

Current squad

Staff

References

External links 
Eintracht Braunschweig Official Website

Eintracht Braunschweig seasons
Eintracht Braunschweig season 2013-14